Horacena J. Taylor (born November 21, 1940) is an American director and stage manager. She is best known for staging the original off-Broadway production of Steve Carter's critically acclaimed play Nevis Mountain Dew.

Biography

Taylor was born in Columbia, South Carolina and is a graduate of Hampton Institute.  She also attended Howard University where she was a business manager for the Howard Players. Relocating to New York City, she gained the reputation as "one of best stage managers in New York."

Starting in the early 1970s, Taylor has worked extensively as a stage manager on numerous productions for the Negro Ensemble Company (NEC) including The Sty of the Blind Pig, The First Breeze of Summer and The Brownsville Raid.

In 1978, she made her off-Broadway debut as a director with the play Nevis Mountain Dew by Steve Carter.  The critically acclaimed production was selected by the Burns Mantle Yearbook as one of the ten best plays of the 1978–1979 season. For her work as a director, Taylor received a Drama Desk Award nomination.

Selected Credits

Theatre

Awards and nominations
 1979 Drama Desk Award nomination, Outstanding Director of a Play for Nevis Mountain Dew

References

External links

1940 births
Living people
American theatre directors
Women theatre directors
People from Columbia, South Carolina